In the Solomon Islands, the Leader of the Official Opposition is the leader of the largest political party in the National Parliament that is not in government. The title of "Leader of the Opposition" is common to the Commonwealth realms and several other Commonwealth countries, though in Solomon Islands it is specifically defined by the Constitution. The Leader of the Opposition appoints and leads a Shadow Cabinet. The current Leader of the Opposition, since December 2014, is Jeremiah Manele.

Constitutional provisions
The position of "Leader of the Official Opposition" is established by article 66 of the Constitution of 1978, which has been the country's Constitution since independence. Article 66 states that the Leader of the Opposition is appointed by the Governor-General, who chooses the Member of Parliament who is considered leader by a significant opposition group within Parliament. In practice, this means the Leader of the Opposition is elected by the members of the Opposition, and then formally recognised and appointed by the Governor-General. The Leader of the Opposition is dismissed by the Governor-General if they no longer enjoys the support of the Opposition.

Article 66 also provides for the Governor-General to appoint a Leader of the Independent Members – i.e., a parliamentary leader of Members of Parliament who remain unaligned with the government or with the Opposition.

List
The following have served as Leaders of the Official Opposition in Solomon Islands. (Given the fluctuating nature of majority coalitions, successful motions of no confidence and thus changes in government are frequent during a parliamentary term. Consequently, there are in most cases several successive Leaders of the Opposition during a single Parliament.)

Steve Abana of the Democratic Party became Leader of the Opposition on 30 August 2010, following the 2010 general election. He resigned from that position in late March 2011, and the Opposition chose Derek Sikua to replace him. Sikua thus led the 2011-2014 Shadow Cabinet.

On 9 December 2014, following the 2014 general election, Jeremiah Manele was appointed as Leader of the Opposition. He held that post until 17 November 2017. In 2018, Manasseh Maelanga was Leader of the Opposition. And following the April 2019 general election, the Leader of the Opposition is Matthew Wale.

See also
 Shadow Cabinet of Solomon Islands
 Prime Minister of Solomon Islands
 Leader of the Opposition (United Kingdom)
 Westminster system

References

Leaders of the Opposition (Solomon Islands)
Leaders of the Opposition
Solomon Islands